The 2010–11 season in Romanian football was held between the summer of 2010 and the summer of 2011. The first division consisted of 18 teams, with CFR Cluj as the defending champions. The men's national team started the UEFA Euro 2012 qualifying campaign in Group D, along with France, Belarus, Bosnia and Herzegovina, Albania and Luxembourg.

Domestic leagues
In Liga I, Oţelul Galaţi won the title for the first time in their history and qualified into the group stage of the 2011–12 UEFA Champions League. Runners-up came Timișoara, while the third placed were Vaslui. However, at the end of the season Timișoara were being relegated for accumulated debt and by this not allowed to play in the qualifying round of the Champions League, by the Romanian Football Federation. Top scorer of the league was Ianis Zicu of Timișoara with 18 goals.

Steaua Bucharest gained the Romanian Cup again after eleven years, in a final over archrivals Dinamo Bucharest played in Braşov.

In Liga II, Ceahlăul Piatra Neamţ and Petrolul Ploieşti won the two series, with Concordia Chiajna and Bihor Oradea as runners-up. Still, Bihor Oradea were not given a first division license for the following season and were ineligible for promotion. The decision regarding the structure of next season's leagues was still in debate on June 20.

The champions of the six Liga III series were Bacău, Callatis Mangalia, Chindia Târgovişte, Slatina, Luceafărul Oradea and Maramureş Universitar Baia Mare.

European competitions

CFR Cluj
The champions CFR Cluj were drawn directly into the group stage of the 2010–11 UEFA Champions League, thanks to a good coefficient of the Romanian association, where they were paired with Basel, Rome and Bayern München. Unluckily they would only achieve a victory over Basel in the first game and a draw with Rome in the last, finishing the group on last place.

Unirea Urziceni
Runners up of previous season and champions of 2009, Unirea Urziceni, were defeated in the third qualifying round of the Champions League by Zenit St. Petersburg by 0–1 on aggregate. Moving into the play-off round of the Europa League, they were paired with Hajduk Split. They would get eliminated from Europe after a 5–2 defeat on aggregate. Their home games were played at the Steaua Stadium in Bucharest, because Unirea's stadium did not meet the UEFA criteria. Manager at Unirea in 2010 was Israeli Ronny Levy. The team relegated at the end of the season after their owner withdrew financial support and they had to sell most of their players to pay debts.

Vaslui
Third placed team Vaslui were drawn against Lille in the Europa League play-off round and they were eliminated after losing 0–2 in the away leg.

Steaua Bucharest
Steaua Bucharest was the most successful Romanian team in the European competitions this season. They were drawn against Grasshopper in the Europa League play-off round and managed to qualify for the second time in the group stage, after passing the Swiss team on penalty shoot-out. There, they were drawn with Liverpool, Napoli and Utrecht. They managed to gain six points in the group, finishing third. Among the notable matches there was 3–1 home victory against Utrecht, a 1–1 draw at home against Liverpool, but also a slipped away victory after a 3–3 draw at home with Napoli, Cavani scoring the equaliser goal in the 98th minute, followed by a similar scenario in the away game, with Cavani scoring for 1–0 in 93rd minute.

Timișoara
Fifth placed team Timișoara were drawn in the third qualifying round of the Europa League against MyPa from Finland, which they surpassed 5–4 on aggregate, after a spectacular comeback from three goals down in the second leg. However, in the play-off round they were drawn against Manchester City and were defeated twice in a row, 0–1 and 0–2. At the end of the season, although finishing second, the team is relegated for unpaid debts, putting an end to their nine-year spell in the top division.

Dinamo Bucharest
Dinamo Bucharest benefited from the fact that 2010 Romanian Cup winners were placed first and third in the league, so that one more Europa League spot was awarded for the team on sixth place. They started in the second qualifying round with a tie against Moldovan side Olimpia Bălţi. After a 2–0 victory in the away game played in Chişinău, it followed a 5–1 win at home. Next team they were drawn against, in the third qualifying round, were the Croats from Hajduk Split. It was the tie prior to the encounter with Unirea Urziceni and Dinamo were eliminated by 3–4 on aggregate after they won 3–1 at home and lost 0–3 away.

Men's national team
On June 4, 2011, Răzvan Lucescu resigned from the helm of the national team, following a two-year term, to take charge at Rapid Bucharest. Victor Piţurcă, the manager before Lucescu, was hired again as the head coach, with a contract valid until November 30, 2015. The aim will be qualification to Euro 2016.

Friendly matches

Euro 2012 Qualifying

The Romania men's national team were drawn into UEFA Euro 2012 qualifying Group D. Group D fixtures were negotiated between the participants at a meeting in Luxembourg on 19 February 2010.

The home teams are in the left column; the away teams are in the right column.

References

 
Seasons in Romanian football
Romanian